Kavala International Airport "Alexander the Great" (Greek: Κρατικός Αερολιμένας Καβάλας «Μέγας Αλέξανδρος», Kratikós Aeroliménas Kaválas "Mégas Aléxandros")  is an airport located in the municipality of Nestos, in Greece.

History

The airport was originally located closer to Kavala, in the installations of the Greek Air Force, near the village of Amygdaleonas, where it began its operations in 1952 as Kavala National Airport. On 12 October 1981, it was moved near the town of Chrysoupoli, where it operates today. The relocation greatly improved the service to the nearby island of Thasos and the city of Xanthi, in addition to the continued service to the cities of Kavala and Drama.

The airport was initially used only for domestic flights, as the original name implies. In December 1987, by a joint decision of the Minister of Presidency and the Minister for Transport and Communications it was renamed to Kavala International Airport to be again renamed in January 1992 to Kavala International Airport "Megas Alexandros", by a decision of the Minister for Transport and Communications.

At the beginning of its operation at its new location, the building infrastructure of the airport included only a terminal building. The control tower, the fire station and the other installations were built later. A small extension to the terminal building was added in 1992. The runway had been built, with the same dimensions that it has today. In 1998, extensive works began for new building infrastructure and today the airport of Kavala is functioning as a single upgraded total (old and new installations together), including all modern facilities for service both to airlines and passengers, contributing to the growth of East Macedonia and Thrace.

In December 2015, the privatisation of Kavala International Airport and 13 other regional airports of Greece was finalised with the signing of the agreement between the Fraport AG/Copelouzos Group joint venture and the state privatisation fund. "We signed the deal today," the head of Greece's privatisation agency HRADF, Stergios Pitsiorlas, told Reuters. According to the agreement, the joint venture will operate the 14 airports (including Kavala International Airport) for 40 years as of 11 April 2017.

Fraport Greece's investment plan

On 22 March 2017, Fraport Greece presented its master plan for the 14 Greek regional airports, including the International Airport of Kavala.

Immediate actions that will be implemented at the airports as soon as Fraport Greece takes over operations, before the launch of the 2017 summer season include:

 General clean-up
 Improving lighting, marking of airside areas
 Upgrading sanitary facilities
 Enhancing services and offering a new free Internet connection (WiFi)
 Implementing works to improve fire safety in all the areas of the airports

The following summarizes the enhancement changes that will start in October 2017 and will be implemented for Kavala International Airport, under Fraport Greece's investment plan, by 2021:

 Terminal expansion by 2,029 m2
 Remodeling the current terminal
 HBS inline screening
 Refurbishing and expanding the fire station
 Expanding the waste water treatment plant or connection to municipal service
 Reorganizing the airport apron area
 Refurbishing the airside pavement
 20 percent increase in the number of check-in counters (from 8 to 10)

Airlines and destinations
The following airlines operate regular scheduled and charter flights at Kavala Airport:

Statistics 

The data taken from the Hellenic Civil Aviation Authority (CAA) until 2016 and from 2017 onwards from the Fraport Greece website.

Traffic statistics by country (2022)

See also
Transport in Greece

References

External links 
 Hellenic Civil Aviation Authority: Our Airports: Kavala Airport, "Megas Alexandros"
 Greek Airport Guide: Kavala Airport, "Megas Alexandros"

Airports in Greece
Buildings and structures in Kavala